Peggy Levitt is professor and chair of the sociology department at Wellesley College and an associate  at Harvard University's Weatherhead Center for International Affairs and Hauser Center for Nonprofit Organization where she co-directs the Transnational Studies Initiative. Peggy writes regularly about globalization, arts and culture, immigration, and religion. Her latest book, Artifacts and Allegiances: How Museums Put the Nation on Display, is published by the University of California Press.

Biography 
Levitt is professor and chair of the sociology department at Wellesley College and the co-director of the Transnational Studies Initiative at Harvard.

Levitt was the CMRS Distinguished Visiting Scholar at the American University of Cairo in March 2015 and a Robert Schuman Fellow at the European University Institute in summer 2015.   In 2014, she received an honorary doctoral degree from Maastricht University, held the Astor Visiting Professorship at Oxford University, and was a guest professor at the University of Vienna. She has been a senior visiting scholar at the Universities of Deusto (Bilbao), Latvia, and Valencia in 2013, the visiting international fellow at the Vrije University in Amsterdam from 2010 to 2012 and the Willie Brandt Guest Professor at the University of Malmö in 2009. Her books include Religion on the Edge (Oxford University Press, 2012), God Needs No Passport: Immigrants and the Changing American Religious Landscape (New Press 2007), The Transnational Studies Reader (Routledge 2007), The Changing Face of Home: The Transnational Lives of the Second Generation  (Russell Sage 2002), and The Transnational Villagers (UC Press, 2001). She has edited special volumes of Racial and Ethnic Studies, International Migration Review, Global Networks, Mobilities, and the Journal of Ethnic and Migration Studies.  A film based on her work, Art Across Borders, released in 2009.

Works 

Artifacts and Allegiances: How Museums Put the Nation and the World on Display (University of California Press, 2015)
Books, Bodies, and Bronzes: Comparing Sites of Global Citizenship Creation. Co-editor (with Pál Nyiri) of special volume of Ethnic and Racial Studies, Vol 37 (12).
Religion on Edge (Co-editor with Courtney Bender, Wendy Cadge, and David Smilde) (Oxford University Press, 2012)
The Transnational Studies Reader (Co-editor with Sanjeev Khagram) (Routledge, 2007)
God Needs No Passport: Immigrants and the Changing American Religious Landscape (The New Press, 2007)
The Transnational Villagers (University of California Press, 2001)
The Changing Face of Home (Co-editor with Mary Waters) (Russell Sage Publications, 2002)

Opinion pieces 

The Huffington Post, June 11, 2007, “Transnational Problems Need Transnational Solutions”
The Huffington Post, June 6, 2007, “Dios Ha Muerto?”
The Boston Globe, May 27, 2007, “Life, Liberty, and the Folks Back Home”
The Boston Globe, May 27, 2007, “The Global in the Local”
The Huffington Post, May 18, 2007, “Religion Isn’t One-Size-Fits-All”
Seattle Post Intelligencer, May 15, 2007, “’Us vs. them’ mentality holds us back”
The New York Times, May 6, 2007, “A Good Provider is One Who Leaves” (letter to the editor)

References

External links 
Peggy Levitt's website
Wellesley College
The Hauser Center for Nonprofit Organizations
The Weatherhead Center for International Affairs at Harvard University
Conversations Across Borders: A Workshop in Transnational Studies

Living people
American women writers
Wellesley College faculty
Harvard Fellows
Year of birth missing (living people)
American women academics
21st-century American women